Dan Erez (28 May 1933 – November 2015) was an Israeli basketball player. He competed in the men's tournament at the 1952 Summer Olympics.

References

External links
 

1933 births
2015 deaths
Israeli men's basketball players
Olympic basketball players of Israel
Basketball players at the 1952 Summer Olympics
Place of birth missing
1954 FIBA World Championship players
20th-century Israeli people
21st-century Israeli people